The Pontifical Institute for Foreign Missions or PIME is a society of secular priests and lay people who dedicate their lives to missionary activities in: Algeria, Bangladesh, Brazil, Cambodia, Cameroon, Chad, Guinea-Bissau, Hong Kong, India, Ivory Coast, Japan, Mexico, Myanmar, Papua New Guinea, Philippines and Thailand.

Independently founded in Milan in 1850 and Rome in 1874 as a group of missionary-style diocesan priests and seminarians, these two seminaries were merged and officially recognized as PIME in 1926 by Pope Pius XI. PIME supports more than 500 missionaries in 18 countries and is headquartered in Rome. The institute opened its North American Regional headquarters in Detroit in 1947 at the invitation of then Detroit Archbishop Cardinal Edward Mooney.

The North American Region focuses its efforts by being at the service of the Church, both locally and globally. The members of PIME minister in local parishes, fostering vocations, mission awareness and financial assistance to their missions and missionaries around the World. PIME has built more than 2,000 churches and chapels and either operates or supports many hospitals and clinics, schools, orphanages and shelters. Among the programs offered by PIME are: 
 Chapel Building
 Foster Parents - Adoptions at a Distance 
 Masses 
 Missionary Medical Relief
 Native Seminarians Program
 Special Appeals
 Special Projects
 Vocations

Peoples and Culture Museum 
The Peoples and Culture Museum was founded in 1910 at the PIME Center in Milan, which houses collections from Asia, Africa, Oceania and Latin America.

References

External links 
  
 PIME USA
 PIME Hong Kong/China

Catholic missions
Societies of apostolic life
Catholic organizations established in the 19th century
Religious organizations established in 1850